Albert Félix Ignace Kazimirski or Albin de Biberstein (20 November 1808 – 22 June 1887) was a French orientalist and Arabist of Polish origin, author of an Arabic-French dictionary and a number of Arab-French translations, including the Quran.

Biography 
He learned oriental languages at the University of Warsaw and later University of Berlin.

He took part in the 1830 November Uprising of the kingdom of Poland against the Czar of Russia and the King of Poland Nicholas I of Russia. Like many other Poles, after the defeat of the Polish army in September 1831, he chose to go into exile in France, where he traveled with the historian Joachim Lelewel.

In 1834, alongside Adam Mickiewicz and Bohdan Zaleski, he founded the Slavic Society (Towarszystwo słowiańskie) of Paris. He also wrote a Polish-French dictionary.

Then he became a dragoman, providing interpretation of languages for the representatives of France to the Levantine échelles, and was attached to the mission of Persia.

He contributed to the revision of the second translation of the Quran into French based on the 1783 works of Claude-Étienne Savary. He eventually created his own translation drawing on the earlier works of the Italian cleric Louis Maracci (1698) and the English George Sale (1734) and later published for the first time in 1840.

Albert Kazimirski de Biberstein is buried at Montrouge Cemetery.

Works 
1840 (or 1852): Le Koran, traduction nouvelle faite sur le texte arabe / par M. Kasimirski, interprète de la légation française en Perseage 1841, 1844, Paris, Charpentier, 511 p., 1970, Garnier Flammarion, with a preface by Mohammed Arkoun, and 1997, Jean de Bonnot
1860: Dictionnaire arabe-français, contenant toutes les racines de la langue arabe, leurs dérivés, tant dans l'idiome vulgaire que dans l'idiome littéral, ainsi que les dialectes d'Alger et de Maroc, Paris, Maisonneuve et Cie, 2 volumes, 1392 and 2369 pages. (reprinted in 1944, Beyrouth, éditions du Liban, and 2005, édition Albouraq)
1886: Manoutchehri: Poète persan du 11ème siècle de notre ère (du 5ième de l'hégire): Texte, traduction, notes, et introduction historique. Paris. Klincksieck. (Another copy, dated 1887).
 Dialogues français-persans : précédés d'un précis de la grammaire persane et suivis d'un vocabulaire français-persan.
 Enis el-Djelis ou Histoire de la belle Persane. Conte des Mille et une nuits, traduit de l'arabe et accompagné de notes par Albert de Biberstein Kazimirski.

References

Bibliography 
 Kazimirski (Albert-Félix-Ignace de Biberstein), in Grand dictionnaire universel du XIXe siècle, tome 17.

External links 

 Albert de Biberstein-Kazimirski on Open Library
 Albin de Kazimirski Biberstein on Wikisource
 Dictionnaire Arabe-français tome I
 tome II

November Uprising participants
French orientalists
French scholars of Islam
French Arabists
Translators of the Quran into French
19th-century French translators
Arabic–French translators
Writers from Lublin
1808 births
1887 deaths
Polish emigrants to France